Mexico's Next Top Model, sometimes abbreviated as MxNTM, is a Mexican reality television series, based on Tyra Banks' America's Next Top Model. It is the second franchise in Latin America after Brazil's Next Top Model, and like the latter, the Mexican version is broadcast on Sony Entertainment Television.

The series features a group of young women who would be competing for the title of Mexico's Next Top Model and a chance to begin their career in the modeling industry.

Format

Challenges
The challenge usually focuses on an element important to modeling which will help the girls to improve on the photo shoot. A guest judge, who is unique to each episode, evaluates the contestants and decides the winner of the challenge, who receives a prize for her victory.

Judging and elimination
Based upon the girls' performance in the week's challenge, photo shoot, and general attitude, the judges deliberate and decide which girl must leave the competition. Once the judges have made their decision, the girls are called back into the room. The host calls out the names of the girls who performed well in the challenge and photo shoot, giving them a copy of their best photo from the shoot. The last two girls, whose names have not been called, are given criticism about why they were in the bottom two, and one is eliminated. The person who is eliminated does not receive a photo.

Judges

Cycles

External links
 Official website
 Official Facebook page

References

2009 Mexican television series debuts
~
Mexican reality television series
Mexican television series based on American television series